Parothria is a monotypic moth genus of the family Noctuidae erected by George Hampson in 1901. Its only species, Parothria ecuadorina, was first described by John O. Westwood in 1877. It is found in Ecuador.

References

Agaristinae
Monotypic moth genera